Paul Andrew Campbell (born 29 January 1980) is an English former professional footballer who played as a midfielder in the Football League for Darlington.

References

1980 births
Living people
Footballers from Middlesbrough
Association football midfielders
English footballers
Darlington F.C. players
English Football League players